Acentronura gracilissima, the bastard seahorse, is a species of pygmy pipehorse from the coastal waters of Japan and Vietnam, it is expected to occur elsewhere but reports in other areas need to be confirmed. It occurs on rock and algae reefs downto depths of  where it feeds on mysids, small crabs, fish larvae and probably also on harpacticoid copepods and gammarid shrimps as recorded in other species in the family Syngnathidae. The bastard seahorse is ovoviviparous; the males incubate the eggs in a brood pouch located under the tail.

References

gracilissima
Fish of the Pacific Ocean
Fish described in 1850
Taxa named by Hermann Schlegel
Taxa named by Coenraad Jacob Temminck